Cirrhochrista brizoalis is a moth of the family Crambidae described by Francis Walker in 1859. It is found across south and south-east Asia from India to Taiwan and in New Guinea and Australia.

References

External links

Spilomelinae
Moths of Asia
Moths of Oceania
Moths described in 1859